American singer-songwriter Lana Del Rey has nine studio albums, four extended plays (EPs), 38 singles (including four as a featured artist), 16 promotional singles and one box set. She also has one leaked demo album, which was not released officially. According to Recording Industry Association of America (RIAA), Del Rey has sold 32 million singles and 15.5 million albums in the United States. Billboard rank her as the 37th Top Rock Artist of the 2010s. Del Rey has also sold 7.1 million singles units in United Kingdom.

Del Rey signed a record deal with 5 Points Records in 2007. Through 5 Points, she released her debut EP, Kill Kill (2008), under the name Lizzy Grant, and her debut studio album, Lana Del Ray (2010), under the name Lana Del Ray. Lana Del Ray has been pulled from music stores because 5 Points was unable to fund it. In 2011, Del Rey self-released her debut single, "Video Games", under her current stage name Lana Del Rey. The single peaked within the top ten on singles charts and received certifications in many European countries, including double platinum certifications in Germany (where it reached number one) and Switzerland. In the US, "Video Games" peaked at number 91 on the Billboard Hot 100 and was certified gold by the Recording Industry Association of America (RIAA).

In 2012, Del Rey signed a joint record deal with Interscope and Polydor Records and released her second studio album, Born to Die, which contained "Video Games". Born to Die peaked at number two on the US Billboard 200 and topped albums charts of Australia and many European countries. By 2014, the album had sold one million copies in the US and seven million copies worldwide. The album spawned five other singles: "Born to Die", "Blue Jeans", "Summertime Sadness", "National Anthem", and "Dark Paradise". "Born to Die" was a moderate success in Europe, peaking within the top ten on charts of Austria and the UK. "Summertime Sadness" was supported by a remix by Cedric Gervais, which peaked at number six on the Billboard Hot 100, becoming Del Rey's first US top-ten single. The single was certified multi-platinum in Italy and the US (solo version), and Australia, Canada, and the UK (remix version).

Del Rey released an EP, Paradise, and a reissue of Born to Die, Born to Die: The Paradise Edition, in late 2012. She recorded and released the singles "Young and Beautiful" and "Once Upon a Dream" for the soundtracks of The Great Gatsby (2013) and Maleficent (2014), respectively. "Young and Beautiful" was certified platinum in the US and Canada and multi-platinum in Australia and Italy. Her third studio album, Ultraviolence (2014), was her first US Billboard 200 number one. It peaked atop albums charts in Australia, Canada, New Zealand, and the UK. Ultraviolence was supported by four singles: "West Coast" (which was certified silver in the UK), "Shades of Cool", "Ultraviolence", and "Brooklyn Baby". Del Rey's fourth studio album, Honeymoon (2015), peaked atop the albums chart of Australia and spawned two singles: "High by the Beach" and "Music to Watch Boys To".

Her fifth studio album, Lust for Life, was released in 2017. It was Del Rey's second Billboard 200 number-one album, and peaked atop albums charts in Australia, Canada, and the UK. Two of its singles, "Love" and "Lust for Life" (featuring the Weeknd), were certified silver in the UK. "Love" was certified gold in Italy. Del Rey released her sixth studio album, Norman Fucking Rockwell!, in 2019. The album peaked atop the albums charts of Switzerland and the UK. One of its singles, "Doin' Time" (a cover of Sublime's song), was certified gold in Canada. She recorded the single "Don't Call Me Angel" with Ariana Grande and Miley Cyrus, which featured on the Charlie's Angels soundtrack (2019) and entered the top five in Australia, Switzerland, and the UK. She released a spoken word album for her debut poetry book, Violet Bent Backwards over the Grass, in 2020.

Albums

Studio albums

Demo albums

Audio books

Reissues

Box sets

Extended plays

Singles

As lead artist

As featured artist

Promotional singles

Other charted and certified songs

Footnotes

References

External links
 
 

Discography
Discographies of American artists
Pop music discographies